Mountain Meadows is an unincorporated community and a census-designated place (CDP) located in and governed by Boulder County, Colorado, United States. The CDP is a part of the Boulder, CO Metropolitan Statistical Area. The population of the Mountain Meadows CDP was 274 at the United States Census 2010. The Boulder post office (Zip Code 80302) serves the area.

Geography
Mountain Meadows is located in south-central Boulder County in the hills west of the city of Boulder. Primary access is via Sugarloaf Road from Boulder Canyon Drive (State Highway 119). The CDP is bordered by Crisman to the northeast and Sugarloaf to the southwest.

Demographics

See also

Outline of Colorado
Index of Colorado-related articles
State of Colorado
Colorado cities and towns
Colorado census designated places
Colorado counties
Boulder County, Colorado
Colorado metropolitan areas
Front Range Urban Corridor
North Central Colorado Urban Area
Denver-Aurora-Boulder, CO Combined Statistical Area
Boulder, CO Metropolitan Statistical Area

References

External links

Boulder County website

Census-designated places in Boulder County, Colorado
Census-designated places in Colorado
Denver metropolitan area